The 2017–18 season was Al-Batin's second consecutive season in Pro League and their 39th year in existence. This season Al-Batin participated in the Pro League and King Cup. The season covered the period from 1 July 2017 to 30 June 2018.

Players

Squad information

Transfers

In

Loans in

Out

Loans out

Pre-season friendlies

Competitions

Overall

Last Updated: 12 April 2018

Pro League

League table

Results summary

Results by round

Matches
All times are local, AST (UTC+3).

Crown Prince Cup

All times are local, AST (UTC+3).

King Cup

Al-Batin entered the King Cup in the Round of 32 alongside the other Pro League teams. In the first round, they defeated Al-Mujazzal and progressed to the Round of 16. In the Round of 16, Al-Batin defeated First Division side Damac with goals from new signings Guilherme and Jorge Silva. In the Quarter-finals, Al-Batin beat fellow Pro League side Al-Nassr and reached the Semi-finals for the first time in history. In the Semi-finals, Al-Batin lost to Al-Ittihad.

All times are local, AST (UTC+3).

Statistics

Squad statistics
As of 12 April 2018.

|-
!colspan="14"|Players who left during the season

|}

Goalscorers

Last Updated: 12 April 2018

Clean sheets

Last Updated: 22 February 2018

References

Al Batin FC seasons
Batin